The Morrison Hill Swimming Pool is a public swimming pool complex in Morrison Hill, Wan Chai, Hong Kong. It was the first indoor public pool in Hong Kong as well as the first heated public pool.

History
The Morrison Hill Swimming Pool was officially opened on 31 October 1972 by Sir Douglas Clague. The Royal Hong Kong Jockey Club donated over HK$8 million towards the complex's construction. At opening, the swimming complex comprised a heated 50-metre heated main pool, an outdoor pool, and a paddling pool for young children. It was designed by architect Sam Lim. The pool was operated by the Urban Council until 2000.

A second indoor pool was opened to the public on 28 June 1982. It was the Urban Council's first indoor teaching pool, and the first in Hong Kong equipped with a ramp for the convenience of disabled people. It cost HK$5.2 million.

In 2000, when the Urban Council was disbanded, management of the pool was taken up by the newly-formed Leisure and Cultural Services Department.

Facilities
Today, the swimming complex has four pools. Indoors, there is a 50-metre main pool with a 203-seat spectator stand, as well as a smaller training pool. The outdoor pool deck is home to a teaching pool and a toddler's pool.

References

External links

 

Morrison Hill
Swimming venues in Hong Kong